The Birch River is a tributary of the Elk River in rural central West Virginia in the United States, on the unglaciated Allegheny Plateau.  It rises near the town of Cowen in western Webster County, and flows generally WNW through northern Nicholas County and southern Braxton County, where it joins the Elk. Tributaries are Millcreek, Polemic Creek, and Skyles Creek.

The river most likely was named after birch trees lining its banks.

Little Birch River
Mouth: 
The Little Birch River is a tributary of the Birch.  It rises in western Webster County and flows generally westward through southern Braxton County.

See also
List of West Virginia rivers

References

Rivers of West Virginia
Elk River (West Virginia)
Rivers of Braxton County, West Virginia
Rivers of Nicholas County, West Virginia
Rivers of Webster County, West Virginia
Allegheny Plateau